The Pitchfork Music Festival is an annual summer music festival organized by Pitchfork Media and held in Union Park in Chicago, Illinois. Starting in 2011, the festival announced a branch staged in Paris at Grande halle de la Villette. The festival, which is normally held over three days (Friday, Saturday and Sunday) in July, focuses primarily on artists and bands from the alternative rock, hip hop, electronic and dance music genres, although it has also ranged into hardcore punk, experimental rock and jazz in its lineups.  While it started as a showcase for just the "cutting edge", it later took on a broader depth and vision, keeping the cutting-edge focus but also including important artists and acts that have influenced newer performers and artists. A branch planned for Berlin at Tempodrom in 2020 was cancelled.

In addition to music, the Pitchfork Festival also includes food, beverages, art, and gig posters from local, regional, and national vendors. The Pitchfork Festival also hosts a record fair that is organized and managed by CHIRP Radio, a Chicago community radio station.

Chicago

2022

The 2022 festival was held on July 15–17 at Union Park in Chicago. The headliners were The National, Mitski and The Roots.

2021

The 2021 festival was held on September 10–12 at Union Park in Chicago. The edition was headlined by Erykah Badu, Phoebe Bridgers and St. Vincent.

2020
The 2020 Pitchfork Festival was cancelled due to the COVID-19 pandemic.

The artists and bands that were scheduled to perform at the 2020 festival are listed below. The headliners were scheduled to be the Yeah Yeah Yeahs, Run the Jewels, and The National.

Friday: Jehnny Beth, Deafheaven, Dehd, Fennesz, Femdot, The Fiery Furnaces, Hop Along, Kaina, Angel Olsen, Sophie, Spellling, Tim Hecker & the Konoyo Ensemble, Waxahatchee, and Yeah Yeah Yeahs

Saturday: BadBadNotGood, Boy Scouts, Danny Brown, Cat Power, Dave, Divino Niño, Ezra Collective, Margaux, Oso Oso, Run the Jewels, Thundercat, Twin Peaks, Sharon Van Etten, Tierra Whack

Sunday: Big Thief, Phoebe Bridgers, DJ Nate, Dogleg, Dustin Laurenzi's Snaketime, Kim Gordon, The Hecks, Mariah the Scientist, Maxo Kream, The National, Caroline Polachek, Rapsody, Faye Webster, Yaeji

2019

The 2019 festival was held July 19–21 at Union Park in Chicago. The headliners were Haim, The Isley Brothers, and Robyn.

2018

The 2018 festival was held July 20–22 at Union Park in Chicago. The headliners were Tame Impala, Fleet Foxes, and Ms. Lauryn Hill.

2017

The 2017 festival was held July 14–16 at Union Park in Chicago. The headliners were LCD Soundsystem, A Tribe Called Quest, and Solange.

2016

The 2016 Pitchfork Music Festival took place on July 15–17 at Union Park in Chicago.

2015

The 2015 Pitchfork Music Festival was held on July 17–19 at Union Park in Chicago. The event's headliners were Wilco, Sleater-Kinney, and Chance the Rapper.

2014

The 2014 Pitchfork Music Festival was held on July 18–20 at Union Park in Chicago.  The event's headliners were Beck, Neutral Milk Hotel, and Kendrick Lamar. Three-day passes for the festival sold out by the beginning of April.

2013

The 2013 Pitchfork Music Festival was held on July 19–21 at Union Park in Chicago. The event's headliners were Björk, Belle & Sebastian, and R. Kelly.

2012

The 2012 Pitchfork Music Festival was held on July 13–15 at Union Park in Chicago. Three day passes went on sale March 9 and sold out by the end of the month. The headliners were Feist, Godspeed You! Black Emperor, and Vampire Weekend.

2011

The 2011 Pitchfork Music Festival was held on July 15–17 at Union Park. Three-day passes for the event sold out in one day. The festival was headlined by Animal Collective, Fleet Foxes and TV on the Radio.

2010

The fifth annual Pitchfork Music Festival was held on July 16–18 at Union Park. Three-day passes for the festival sold out in under a week. 2010 marked the first and only year that the festival included a stand-up comedy stage.

2009

The 2009 Pitchfork Music Festival was held July 17–19, 2009. On Friday night all of the performing bands played sets consisting of songs voted for online by ticket-holders in an event Pitchfork called "Write the Night: Set Lists by Request."

2008

The 2008 Pitchfork Music Festival was held July 18–20, 2008. Three-day passes for the event sold out in May. On Friday night the promotion company All Tomorrow's Parties again collaborated with Pitchfork to present a "Don't Look Back" stage, on which all of the evening's bands performed one of their classic albums in its entirety.

2007

The 2007 Pitchfork Music Festival was held on July 13–15, 2007, again in Union Park. The festival was sold out with 48,000 visitors.

2006

The 2006 Pitchfork Music Festival was the first festival organized and run entirely by Pitchfork Media. This was also the only year that the Pitchfork and Intonation Music Festivals were held in the same year. The 2006 Pitchfork festival drew more than 35,000 visitors to listen to 41 bands on July 29 and 30.

2005 Intonation Music Festival
In 2005 Pitchfork Media was hired by a music promotion company called Skyline Chicago to curate the Intonation Festival at Union Park in Chicago. While this was not technically the "Pitchfork Music Festival," because of Pitchfork Media's prominent role in the event as well as its future success in staging similar festivals at the same location, many Chicagoans and music fans consider the 2005 event to be for all intents and purposes the first Pitchfork festival and refer to it by that name.

The event's featured performers included Tortoise, The Wrens, The Decemberists, The Go! Team, Les Savy Fav, Broken Social Scene, Andrew Bird, and The Hold Steady.

Paris

2021
The 2021 Paris festival was held on 15 to 21 November 2021. The festival was held in ten venues across Paris, including Salle Pleyel, Bataclan, La Gaîté Lyrique, and Church of St. Eustache.

Monday, 15 November
Church of Saint Eustache: Bobby Gillespie & Jehnny Beth

Tuesday, 16 November
La Gaîté Lyrique: Shygirl, Alewya, Denise Chaila

Wednesday, 17 November
La Gaîté Lyrique: Charlotte Adigéry & Bolis Pupul, Amaarae, Hope Tala

Thursday, 18 November
Bataclan: Sons of Kemet, Nubya Garcia, cktrl

Friday, 19 November
Le Café de la Danse: Cassandra Jenkins, Lael Neale, Gabriels
POPUP!: Kai Kwasi, Sloppy Jane, Erika de Casier
Badaboum: KeiyaA, Claud, Godford
Badaboum After Party: Denis Sulta, Sofia Kourtesis, TSHA
Les Disquaires: Miso Extra, Elliott Armen
Supersonic Records: Kynsy, NewDad, TV Priest
Supersonic: Talk Show, Molly Payton, Wet Leg

Saturday, 20 November
Le Café de la Danse: Elliott Armen, Faux Real, En Attendant Ana
POPUP!: ML Buch, Kamal., Berwyn
Badaboum: Kam-BU, L'Rain, ENNY
Badaboum After Party: India Jordan, Josey Rebelle, Marina Trench
Les Disquaires: Kathleen Frances, Fabiana Palladino
Supersonic Records: H. Hawkline, Yard Act
Supersonic: Lime Garden, Choses Sauvages, Katy J Pearson

Sunday, 21 November
Salle Pleyel: Sébastien Tellier, Muddy Monk

2019
The 2019 Paris festival was held on October 31, November 1–2. The headliners are Skepta, The 1975, Chromatics, Belle and Sebastian, Mura Masa, Hamza and Charli XCX.

Grande Halle

Thursday: Ezra Collective, Mura Masa, Hamza, Skepta

Friday: Desire, Primal Scream, Chromatics, Belle and Sebastian

Saturday: Jamila Woods, Charli XCX, The 1975, SebastiAn

Nef

Thursday: Kojaque, slowthai, Flohio, Ateyaba, Zola

Friday: Barrie, Nilüfer Yanya, Weyes Blood, John Talabot

Saturday: Caroline Polachek, Aurora, Agar Agar, 2ManyDj's 

Petite Halle

Thursday: sean, Master Peace, Retro X, Yussef Dayes

Friday: Loving, Sons of Raphael, Squid, Sheer Mag, CHAI

Saturday: Mk.gee, Aeris Roves, KadhyaK, Kedr Livanskiy

Studio

Thursday: duendita, Charlotte Dos Santos, Rachel Chinouriri, Kojey Radical, The Comet Is Coming

Friday: Briston Maroney, Nelson Beer, Jackie Mendoza, Orville Peck, Helado Negro

Saturday: Korantemaa, Jessica Pratt, BEA1991, oklou, Ela Minus

2018
The 2018 Paris festival was held on November 1–3. The headliners were Bon Iver, Kaytranada and Mac DeMarco. Pitchfork also hosted Avant-Garde, a block party held on October 30 and 31.

Thursday: New Optimism (Miho Hatori), Cola Boyy, Rolling Blackouts Coastal Fever, Yellow Days, John Maus, Étienne Daho, The Voidz, Mac DeMarco

Friday: Boy Pablo, Tirzah, Dream Wife, Lewis OfMan, Car Seat Headrest, Chromeo, Bagarre, Chvrches, Blood Orange, Kaytranada

Saturday: Michael Rault, Muddy Monk, Snail Mail, Stephen Malkmus and the Jicks, Unknown Mortal Orchestra, Bon Iver, Jeremy Underground, DJ Koze, Peggy Gou, Avalon Emerson, Daniel Avery

Avant-Garde

Cafe de la Danse

Tuesday: Lauren Auder, IDER, Let's Eat Grandma

Wednesday: Naaz, Kelsey Lu, Cautious Clay

Badaboum

Tuesday: Kiran Kai, Rimon, JPEGMafia, Jimothy Lacoste

Wednesday: Etta Bond, Biig Piig, Kojey Radical, Slowthai

Reservoir

Tuesday: Weakened Friends, Holiday Sidewinder, Alaskalaska

Wednesday: Black Midi, Mint Field, Sasami

La Chapelle des Lombards

Tuesday: Sam Evian, Jack Grace, Stella Donnelly

Wednesday: Helena Deland, Gold Star, Honey Harper

Pan Pier

Tuesday: Wicca Phase Springs Eternal, Mellah, Westerman, Apollo Noir

Wednesday: Palm, Anemone, O-Olivier Marguerit, Trevor Powers

Supersonic

Tuesday: Hop Along, Starchild and the new Romantics, Crumb

Wednesday: Madison McFerrin, Hatchie, Yuno

PopUp!

Tuesday: Khadyak, Grand Pax, Jockstrap

Wednesday: Suzi Wu, Buzzy Lee, Anaïs

2017
The 2017 Paris festival was held on November 2–4. The headliners were The National, Jungle and Run the Jewels. Pitchfork also hosted Avant-Garde, a block party held on October 31 and November 1.

Thursday: Ethan Lipton & His Orchestra, Moses Sumney, This Is the Kit, Chassol, Rone, Ride, Kevin Morby, The National

Friday: HMLTD, Cigarettes After Sex, Tommy Genesis, Sylvan Esso, Andy Shauf, Isaac Delusion, Rejjie Snow, Kamasi Washington, Polo & Pan, Jungle

Saturday: Sigrid, Songe, Tom Misch, Loyle Carner, Jacques, BadBadNotGood, Princess Nokia, Run the Jewels, The Blaze, Bicep, The Black Madonna, Talaboman

Avant-Garde

Mécanique Ondulatoire

Tuesday: NOLIFE, Sorry, Bryan's Magic Treats

Wednesday: Bad Nerves, The Pale White, Priests

Café de la Danse

Tuesday: Isaac Gracie, (Sandy) Alex G, Big Thief

Wednesday: Rostam, Nick Hakim, Noga Erez

Badaboum

Tuesday: Mavi Phoenix, Obongjayar, A2, Benny Mails

Wednesday: Sälen, Oklou, Jamila Woods, Hundred Waters

La Loge

Tuesday: Korey Dane, Leif Vollebekk, Julie Byrne

Wednesday: Matt Maltese, Angelo De Augustine, Wovoka Gentle

Pop Up Du Label

Tuesday: K Á R Y Y N, Lido Pimienta, Tennyson

Wednesday: Soleil Vert, Pauli, Oko Ebombo

Pan Piper

Tuesday: Ary, SuperParka, Malca, You Man

Wednesday: Ama Lou, Triplego, Hare Squead, Ray BLK

Supersonic

Tuesday: Puma Blue, Yellow Days, Pinegrove

Wednesday: Silly Boy Blue, Yowl, Vagabon

2016
The 2016 Paris festival was held on October 27–29. The headliners were Nick Murphy FKA Chet Faker, Moderat and M.I.A.

Thursday: Aldous RH, Lucy Dacus, Parquet Courts, Suuns, Floating Points, DJ Shadow, Mount Kimbie, Nick Murphy FKA Chet Faker

Friday: C Duncan, Porches, Brandt Brauer Frick, Flavien Berger, Explosions in the Sky, Bat for Lashes, Todd Terje & the Olsens, Moderat

Saturday: Joey Purp, Bonzai, Whitney, Shame, Minor Victories, Warpaint, Abra, M.I.A., Acid Arab, Motor City Drum Ensemble, Daphni, Tale of Us

Avant-Garde

Café de la Danse

Tuesday: Krrum, Loyle Carner, Frances

Wednesday: Robbing Millions, Adia Victoria, Thom Sonny Green

Badaboum

Tuesday: Nilüfer Yanya, Mabel, Fickle Friends

Wednesday: Skott, Jordan Rakei, Requin Chagrin

Mécanique Ondulatoire

Tuesday: Get Inuit, Hoops, Anteros

Wednesday: Lucy Dacus, Communions, Cherry Glazerr

Supersonic

Tuesday: Klangstof, Smerz, Alex Cameron

Wednesday: Fhin, Dark0, Kenton Slash Demon

Pop-Up du Label

Tuesday: Alfie Connor, Connie Constance, Cleopold

Wednesday: Pi Ja Ma, Beaty Heart, Isaac Gracie

La Loge

Tuesday: Faroe, Cameron A G, Okay Kaya

Wednesday: Alyss, Anna of the North, Kaitlyn Aurelia Smith

Café de la Presse

Tuesday: Manast LL', Kweku Collins, Jones

Wednesday: Salute, Tirzah, Tommy Genesis

Pitchfork & RBMA After Parties

Thursday: Malibu, River Tiber, Jessy Lanza, Clams Casino, Ryan Hemsworth

Friday: Lamusa, Dollkraut DJ, Jacques, Pangaea, Bambounou

2015
The 2015 Paris festival was held on October 29–31. The headliners were Thom Yorke - Tomorrow's Modern Boxes, Beach House and Ratatat.

Thursday: Hælos, Kirin J. Callinan, Destroyer, Ariel Pink, Godspeed You! Black Emperor, Deerhunter, Beach House

Friday: Dornik, Rome Fortune, Health, Rhye, Kurt Vile & The Violators, Battles, Thom Yorke - Tomorrow's Modern Boxes, Four Tet

Saturday: Hinds, Curtis Harding, Nao, Father John Misty, Unknown Mortal Orchestra, Run the Jewels, Spiritualized, Ratatat, Hudson Mohawke, John Talabot b2b Roman Flügel, Laurent Garnier

Opening Night (Tuesday)

Café de la Danse: Børns, Empress Of, LA Priest

Badaboum: SG Lewis, Moses Sumney, Mura Masa, DJ Allie Teilz

Mécanique Ondulatoire: Mild High Club, Bully, Speedy Ortiz

RBMA presents Pitchfork After Party #1 at Trabendo

Thursday: Rustie, Nosaj Thing, two, Gilligan Moss, Jade Statues, John Pope, Keight

Friday: Omar S, Galcher Lustwerk, Andre Bratten, Cosmo, k2k

2014
The 2014 Paris festival was held on October 30–31 and November 1. The headliners were Belle & Sebastian, Caribou and James Blake.

Thursday: Ought, How to Dress Well, The Notwist, The War on Drugs, Mogwai, Jon Hopkins, James Blake

Friday: Perfect Pussy, D.D Dumbo, Son Lux, Future Islands, MØ, Chvrches, St. Vincent, Belle & Sebastian

Saturday: Jessy Lanza, Charlotte OC, Tobias Jesso Jr., Kwamie Liv, Movement, Foxygen, tUnE-yArDs, José González, Jungle, Caribou, Four Tet, Jamie xx, Kaytranada

Opening Party

Wednesday: Kindness, Kelela, All We Are, Shura

After Party

Thursday: Joy Orbison, Martyn, Ryan Elliott, Felix

Friday: Lunice, Fatima Al Qadiri, Sophie, Tourist, Douchka

2013
The 2013 Paris festival was held on October 31 and November 1–2. The headliners were The Knife, Hot Chip and Disclosure.

Thursday: Only Real, Iceage, Blood Orange, No Age, Mac DeMarco, Savages, Mount Kimbie, Darkside, The Haxan Cloak, The Knife

Friday: Petit Fantôme, Deafheaven, Jagwar Ma, Warpaint, Colin Stetson, Junip, Ariel Pink, Connan Mockasin, Danny Brown, Disclosure

Saturday: Empress Of, Pegase, Majical Cloudz, Sky Ferreira, Youth Lagoon, Baths, Omar Souleyman, Yo La Tengo, Panda Bear, Hot Chip, Glass Candy, Todd Terje, A-Trak

Opening Night

Wednesday: Julianna Barwick, The Dodos, Jackson Scott, Forest Swords

After Party

Thursday: John Talabot, Pional, Genius of Time, Evans

Friday: Jon Hopkins, Jacques Greene, Evian Christ, Kuage, Sundae

2012
The 2012 Paris festival was held on November 1–3. The headliners were M83, Animal Collective and Grizzly Bear.

Thursday: How to Dress Well, AlunaGeorge, DIIV, Factory Floor, Japandroids, Chairlift, John Talabot, Sébastien Tellier, James Blake, M83

Friday: Outfit, Ratking, Jessie Ware, Wild Nothing, The Tallest Man on Earth, The Walkmen, Chromatics, Robyn, Fuck Buttons, Animal Collective

Saturday: Isaac Delusion, Cloud Nothings, Purity Ring, Twin Shadow, Liars, Death Grips, Breton, Grizzly Bear, Disclosure, Totally Enormous Extinct Dinosaurs, Rustie, Simian Mobile Disco, Julio Bashmore

2011
The 2011 Paris festival was held on October 28–29. The headliners were Bon Iver and Aphex Twin.

Friday: Team Ghost, Fucked Up, Real Estate, Washed Out, Wild Beasts, Mondkopf, Aphex Twin, Pantha du Prince, Cut Copy, Four Tet, Erol Alkan

Saturday: Rosebuds, Kathleen Edwards, Stornoway, Jens Lekman, Lykke Li, Bon Iver

London

2021
Pitchfork Music Festival London will make its debut in 2021 on 10-14 November. The festival will be held in twelve venues across London.

Wednesday

Village Underground: Mykki Blanco, Charlotte Adigéry & Bolis Pupul, TYSON

Fabric: Anna Meredith, PVA, Grove

Earth Theatre: Bobby Gillespie & Jehnny Beth, Art School Girlfriend

Thursday

Earth Theatre: Bobby Gillespie & Jehnny Beth, Cassandra Jenkins, Natalie Bergman

Fire: PC Music "Love Goes On" (Hannah Diamond, Namasenda, Caro<3, Felicita, Easyfun, Umru, KKB Soundsystem, Mowalola)

Fabric: Giant Swan, Eartheater, DJ Winggold

Friday

Southbank Centre: Black Midi, Moor Mother

Oslo: Denise Chaila, Lex Amor, Carla Prata

Moth Club: Iceage, deathcrash, The Umlauts

Oval Space: Remi Wolf, Gabriels, Joviale

Saturday

Oval Space / Canvas / Pickle Factory: Tirzah, Koreless, Good Sad Happy Bad, Lucinda Chua, Nabihah Iqbal, Kareem Ali, L'Rain, Harvey Causon, Haich Ber Na, Tiberius B

Hackney Church: Moses Boyd, Nilüfer Yanya, Emma-Jean Thackray, cktrl

Sunday

The Roundhouse: Stereolab, Girl Band, Beak>, Ana Roxanne, Folly Group, Martha Skye Murphy, Kynsy

Berlin

2020
The inaugural edition of Pitchfork Music Festival Berlin was to be held on 08–09 May 2020, but was cancelled. The headliners were going to be Lianne La Havas and Modeselektor.

Friday: Lianne La Havas, Soap&Skin, Brandt Brauer Frick, Nadine Shah, Nick Hakim, Celeste, Ilgen-Nur, Oum Shatt, duendita, Okay Kaya

Saturday: Modeselektor , HVOB , Tim Hecker, John Talabot , Kelly Lee Owens, DJ Spinn B2B RP Boo, rRoxymore , Peaking Lights, BLVTH, Lary

References

External links

  (Chicago)
  (Paris)
  (Berlin)
 Cokemachineglow 4-part coverage
 Pitchfork TV has many past performances from 2007 and 2008 Pitchfork Music Festivals
 Gigposters Gigposter's page of Pitchfork Music Festival's concert posters
 Riverfront Times coverage of Pitchfork Music Festival 2008

 
Music festivals established in 2006
Rock festivals in the United States
Music festivals in Chicago
Electronic music festivals in the United States
2006 establishments in Illinois
Indie rock festivals
Magazine festivals